Vinton is a town in Roanoke County, Virginia, United States. The population was 8,059 at the 2020 census. Vinton is part of the Roanoke Metropolitan Statistical Area and the Roanoke Region of Virginia.

History
By the late 18th century, settlers began moving into the area and in 1797, the Gish family established a gristmill on Glade Creek. Afterward the area would become known as Gish's Mill. As the railroad expanded into the Roanoke Valley, Gish's Mill became a stop for the Atlantic, Mississippi and Ohio Railroad. In the late 1870s and early 1880s, the Gish family led a movement to establish a town around the train depot site. A mass meeting to discuss incorporation was held in 1883 and in 1884 the area was incorporated as the Town of Vinton.

Geography
Vinton is located at  (37.277987, −79.895248).

According to the United States Census Bureau, the town has a total area of 3.16 square miles (8.2 km).

The town shares a substantial portion of its western border with the neighboring city of Roanoke. Several neighborhoods in this area are bisected by the border between the two communities. Given its proximity and size, the town is considered a bedroom community for Roanoke.

This lake, however, which was created by the 1904 construction of the hydroelectric Niagara (so-called) dam, is not visible from any inhabited part of the town, is difficult to reach, and is little used.

Vinton has varied topography, considering its 3.2 square mile size. The Vinton side of the lake consists of a steep, wooded cliff  in vertical height.

While the entirety of the town of Vinton is located in Roanoke County, much of its ZIP code also covers the western portion of Bedford County.

Demographics

2020 census
As of the census of 2020, there were 8,059 people residing in the town. There were 3,774 housing units. The racial makeup of the town was 83.6% White, 7.2% Black, 0.2% American Indian, 1.2% Asian, 0.0% Pacific Islander, 1.4% from other races, and 6.4% from two or more races. Hispanic or Latino of any race were 3.6% of the population.

2010 census
As of the census of 2010, there were 8,092 people, 3,774 housing units, and 3,547 households in the town. The racial makeup of the town was 90.0% White, 5.6% African American, 0.1% Native American, 1.0% Asian, 0.0% Pacific Islander, 1.3% from other races, and 2.0% from two or more races. Hispanic or Latino of any race were 2.8% of the population. The median income for a household in the town was $44,667.

Government
Vinton operates a council–manager form of government. Vinton Town Council is composed of a mayor and four council members who are elected at-large.

Education
The town is served by Roanoke County Public Schools. Public school students residing in Vinton are zoned to attend Herman L. Horn Elementary School or W. E. Cundiff Elementary School, William Byrd Middle School, and William Byrd High School.

Media
The Vinton Messenger is a weekly newspaper that covers the town of Vinton. The Roanoke Times, the region's primary newspaper, also covers the town.

Notable people 
 Henry Brabham, hockey executive, former mayor of Vinton
 David R. Goode, railroad executive
 David Huddleston, actor

References

External links
Town website

Towns in Roanoke County, Virginia
Populated places established in 1884
1884 establishments in Virginia
Towns in Virginia